Hinkaböle is a village on the island of Munapirtti in the municipality of Pyhtää, Kymenlaakso, Province of  Southern Finland, Finland.

Further reading
 Johan Ståhl, Wilhelm Ögård: Mogenpörtboken Del 1 : Moöns sång : Wilhelm Ögårds liv och dikter ; Släkten Ögårds rötter, Pyttis 2002,  (in Swedish)

External links
 the webpages of the island of Mogenpört, in Swedish and Finnish

Pyhtää
Villages in Finland